Novomessor is a genus of ants that was described by Italian entomologist Carlo Emery in 1915. Until recently, the genus was thought to be a synonym of Aphaenogaster, but a 2015 phylogenetic study concluded that the two genera were distinct, reviving Novomessor from synonymy. Three species are currently described. This genus is known to inhabit the deserts of southwestern United States and Northern Mexico.

Species
Novomessor albisetosus (Mayr, 1886)
Novomessor cockerelli (André, 1893)
Novomessor ensifer (Forel, 1899)

References

External links

Myrmicinae
Ant genera
Hymenoptera of North America
Insects of the United States
Insects of Mexico